Viggbyholms IK FF is a Swedish football club located in Viggbyholm, which is a neighbourhood of Täby in Stockholm County.

Background
The first sports club was formed in Viggbyholmsvägen on 5 June 1921. The club was called Viggbyholms Idrottsklubb and at the outset specialised in football and general sports. The club later introduced bandy and skiing but by 1928 Viggbyholms IK had ceased to operate. A new club called Viggbyholms SK was founded on 30 October 1930 by a group of teenagers that wished to resurrect the defunct community sports club. The main activities were football and bandy and the new club recorded several successes.

On 1 April 1945 a long discussed merger took place between Gribbylunds SK and Viggbyholms IF. The name of the revamped club was Viggbyholms IK and a host of new activities were adopted including handball. Football was a core activity in the club right from the beginning but was closed for some years in the 1940s before being revived in 1948. In the early 1950s the club gained use of the Hägernäs IP which was up to then a military area.

Viggbyholms IK has participated mainly in the lower divisions of the Swedish football league system, fluctuating between Division 5 and Division 8.  In 2010 the club gained promotion from Division 4 and currently plays in Division 3 Norra Svealand which is the fifth tier of Swedish football. They play their home matches at the Hägernäs IP in Täby.

Viggbyholms IK are affiliated to Stockholms Fotbollförbund.

Recent history
In recent seasons Viggbyholms IK have competed in the following divisions:

2011 – Division 3 Norra Svealand
2010 – Division 4 Stockholm Norra
2009 – Division 4 Stockholm Norra
2008 – Division 4 Stockholm Norra
2007 – Division 4 Stockholm Norra
2006 – Division 4 Stockholm Norra
2005 – Division 4 Stockholm Norra
2004 – Division 4 Stockholm Norra
2003 – Division 5 Stockholm Norra
2002 – Division 5 Stockholm Norra
2001 – Division 5 Stockholm Norra
2000 – Division 5 Stockholm Norra
1999 – Division 6 Stockholm A

Attendances

In recent seasons Viggbyholms IK have had the following average attendances:

Footnotes

External links
 Viggbyholms IK – Official website
 Viggbyholms IK – Men's football team
 Viggbyholms IK – Youth football
 Viggbyholms IK on Facebook

Football clubs in Stockholm
Association football clubs established in 1930
1930 establishments in Sweden